Brooking, Saskatchewan was once a community in the province of Saskatchewan, Canada. It was named after Brookings, South Dakota.

See also 

 List of communities in Saskatchewan
 Hamlets of Saskatchewan
 List of ghost towns in Canada
 Ghost towns in Saskatchewan

References

Former villages in Saskatchewan
Ghost towns in Saskatchewan
Laurier No. 38, Saskatchewan
Division No. 2, Saskatchewan